Abolhasan Saba (April 15, 1902 – December 19, 1957) was a renowned Iranian composer, violinist, and setar player.

Biography

He was born in Tehran to Abul Qasim Khan Kamal ol-Saltaneh, son of Mohammad Jafar Khan Sadr ol-Hekma, son of Mahmud Khan Kashi Malak ol-Shoara Sadr ol-Shoara Saba ol-Shoara, son of Mohammad Hossain Khan Malak ol-Shoara. He studied several of Iranian and non Iranian musical instruments and became an Ostad in Radif, but selected violin and setar as his specific instruments. He was a student of Mirza Abdollah as well as Darvish Khan.

Saba is considered one of Iran's most influential figures in traditional and instrumental Persian music. His first recording for radio was in 1927 when he played violin accompanying Iran's famous singer Ruhangis.

Notable Pupils 

Amongst his many students who went on to become great masters of Persian traditional music were Faramarz Payvar, Manoochehr Sadeghi, Habibollah Badiei, Rahmatollah Badiyi, Abbas Emadi, Ali Tajvidi, Mahmoud Tajbakhsh, Sassan Sepanta, Saeid Gharachorloo, Parviz Yahaghi, Dariush Safvat, Gholam-Hossein Banan and Hossein Tehrani.

He died in 1957 and was buried in Tehran's Zahir o-dowleh Cemetery of artists and musicians.

Saba Museum 

Upon Saba's will in 1974, after his death, the faculty of Fine Arts of the University of Tehran turned his private house into a museum.

See also
Fakhereh Saba

References

 Separ, Mohammad Taqi Lesan ol-Mamalek. Tarikh-e Qajarieh. A Chronicle of the Qajar Period from Shah Quli Khan Qajar to Naser ed-din Shah's first six years.

External links

BBC Article on his 50th memorial 
www.setar.info 
Photograph of Abolhasan Saba

1902 births
1957 deaths
Iranian composers
Iranian setar players
Iranian violinists
People from Tehran
20th-century violinists
20th-century composers
20th-century Iranian people